The Wyoming Department of Health (WDH) is a state agency of Wyoming. It has its headquarters in the Hathaway Building in Cheyenne.

History
In November 1990 Wyoming voters approved a constitutional amendment that abolished the Wyoming Board of Charities and Reform. The institutions of the former state agency were divided and given to other agencies. The Department of Health took the Veterans’ Home of Wyoming, the Wyoming Pioneer Home, the Wyoming Retirement Center, the Wyoming State Hospital, and the Wyoming Training School.

Divisions
Divisions of the department include:
Administration
Aging Division
Community and Public Health Division 
Developmental Disabilities Division
Health Advisory Council
Institutional Review Board
Mental Health and Substance Abuse Services
Office of Healthcare Financing
Preventive Health and Safety Division
Rural and Frontier Health Division
State Healthcare Facilities

Facilities

Health care facilities operated by the department include:
 Veterans' Home of Wyoming (Buffalo) - An assisted living facility for military veterans and their dependents
 Wyoming Pioneer Home (Thermopolis) - An assisted living facility for the elderly
 Wyoming Retirement Center (Basin) - A nursing home, it is located at the base of the Big Horn Mountains, along U.S. Highway 20.
 Wyoming State Hospital (Evanston) - A mental hospital
 Wyoming Life Resource Center (WLRC), originally the Wyoming State Training School (WSTS) (Lander) - A  residential facility for Wyoming residents with physical and mental disabilities that has been in operation since 1912.

References

External links
 

State agencies of Wyoming
State departments of health of the United States
Medical and health organizations based in Wyoming